Roald Mitchell (born January 13, 2003) is an American soccer player who plays as a forward for Wake Forest Demon Deacons.

Club career
Born in Montclair, New Jersey, Mitchell joined the youth academy at the New York Red Bulls in 2018. In March 2021, Mitchell was announced as part of the pre-season roster for the Red Bulls reserve side, New York Red Bulls II.

He made his senior debut for the side in the USL Championship on April 30, 2021, against Hartford Athletic, coming on as a 77th-minute substitute in a 2–3 defeat. He scored his first professional goal on May 23 against the Charleston Battery during a 2–2 draw. On June 16, 2021, Mitchell helped New York to a 3–1 victory over Charlotte Independence, scoring the team's third goal of the match.

In the fall of 2021, Mitchell moved to Wake Forest University to play college soccer.

Career statistics

References

2003 births
Living people
Sportspeople from Essex County, New Jersey
People from Montclair, New Jersey
Association football forwards
New York Red Bulls II players
USL Championship players
Soccer players from New Jersey
Wake Forest Demon Deacons men's soccer players
American soccer players